Mayadhar Swain is an Odia writer from Odisha, India.

Early life and education

Mayadhar Swain was born on 8 February 1956 in the village Baselihata  of Cuttack district in the state of Odisha, India. He passed matriculation from a rural school, Banshidhar Bidyapith at  Kanpur in 1972 with National first class and secured  6th rank in entire Odisha. He passed I.Sc. from  Revenshaw College, Cuttack in 1st Division in 1974. He got  B.Sc. in Electrical Engineering  UCE Burla in 1979 with distinction of 1st class 1st in Sambalpur  University. Then he successfully completed M.E. in  Water Resources Development from prestigious I.I.T., Roorkee with 1st class Hons with Distinction in 1989. He is married to Mrs. Abanti Swain who has been  a catalyst  in his several  academic and research pursuits .

Profession
Mayadhar started his career in National Thermal Power Corporation (NTPC),New Delhi from 1979 to 1982 and later in  Talcher Thermal Power Station (TTPS) from 1982 to 1988 as Assistant Engineer. Then he joined the upper Kolab hydro power plant under the Odisha Hydro Power Corporation and as Assistant Manager and was promoted to Deputy Manager from 1989 to 2000. Later, he quit and joined MECON Limited, Ranchi where he held the post of Deputy General Manager. He has vast expertise in power plant technology. He has published  more than 50 papers in various journals & presented in seminars mainly on Power System. He is one of the widely and nationally acclaimed Electrical engineers of India. After his superannuation from MECON,a GOI undertaking, he works as Professor and Director, heading the School of Electrical Engineering in KITT University, Bhubaneswar.

Literary activities
Mayadhar Swain is a freelance science writer of Odisha. He has written articles extensively on science, engineering and mathematics in newspapers, journals and magazines of the State for over three decades. He has written about seven hundred articles on popular science. He is a member of the Editorial Board of the periodical,  Science Horizon, published by Odisha Bigyan Academy. Several of his talks on science and engineering have been organised on both Doordarshan and All India Radio. He has authored 50 books on popular science for the general public from different walks of life, students and children. He writes in vernacular Oriya language for Oriya-speaking people. He was conferred Life Time Achievement Award for popularization of science by All India People's Science Network (AIPSN), Bharat Gyan Vigyan Samti (BGVS) and National Institute of Science Education and Research (NISER) collectively on the occasion of 16th All India People'S Science Congress, held at NISER Bhubaneswar during Feb 2018,published in leading Odia daily,Dharitri, dated 13th Feb,2018.

Books written
 Bidyut Shakti Utpadan
 Bigyan O Prajukti Bidya
 Prachina Bharatara Baigyanika
 Adhunik Bharatara Baigyanika
 Dhumaketu 
 Adhunika Pruthibira Ascharya
 Mahakash Bigyan Quiz
 Bermuda Tribhuja
 Rocket O Kshepanastra
 Charles Darwin
 Thomas Edison
 Subrahmanyan Chandrasekhar
 Sankhya Bibidha
Bharatar Ganitangna
Bishista Vidyut Bigyani
Aryabhatta"Prachin Bhartiya GanitMahakash Abhijan KahaniParamanuChumbakAPJ Abdul KalamVisveswarayaSatyendranath BoseGalileoGapare Gapare GanitAloukik Sankhya PieNikola TeslaMichael FaradeyMangal Graha AbhijanBalaya Graha ShaniGraharaj BrihaspatiMahakash Bigyan KathaBaniar Thakami Dhara padilaUdbhaban 0 Abiskar KahaniMarie CurieHomi Jahangir Bhaba''

Awards
 Pranakrushna Parija Award of Odisha Bigyan Academy for popularization of science (2008).
 Honoured by Bigyan Prachar Samiti, Cuttack for popularization of science (1999, 2008, 2013)
 Rajadhani Book Fair Award ( 2012)
 Bhubaneswar Book Fair Award (2013)
Life Time Achievement Award for popularization of science collectively by AIPSN, BGVS and NISER in 16th All India People'S Science Congress,Feb 2018
Pranakrushna Parija Bigyan Samman by Utkal Sahitya Samaj,Cuttack,Odisha on 6th June2018

Membership 
 Fellow of Institution of Engineers.
 Member, Utkal Sahitya Samaj
 Member, Bigyan Prachar Samiti, Cuttack
Chief editor of Bigyan Jagat (monthly Odia science magazine), Salipur, Cuttack
Member of Editorial Board of Science Horizon, published by Odisha Bigyan Academy
Member,Orissa Environmental Society

References
    
http://orissabigyanacademy.nic.in
https://www.thehindu.com/todays-paper/tp-national/tp-otherstates/Orissa-Bigyan-Academy-announces-awards/article16505081.ece
http://see.kiit.ac.in/faculties.html
https://www.odishaestore.com/odia-writer-mayadhar-swain

1956 births
Living people
Odia-language writers
People from Cuttack district
Sambalpur University alumni